Moose is the pseudonym of Paul Curtis, a British graffiti artist. Instead of the typical methods of graffiti, Moose creates his art by cleaning dirt and grime off surfaces.

Moose was one of the team of people behind the Leeds-based Soundclash record label, which released records primarily between 1995 and 1999 and was a favorite of Coldcut and Norman Cook. He also promoted the Soundclash club nights, at which Andrew Weatherall was an early fixture and Tricky made a rare - and reputedly dreadful - early DJ appearance. Moose has DJ'ed and promoted extensively across the world.

He is also a commercial artist, and has been paid to create advertisements for companies such as Xbox and Smirnoff.

Career as a Graffiti Artist

Technique 
Paul Curtis uses tools such as a shoe brush, water and manual labor to create freehand drawings and illustrations. He is also known to use a power washer to create intricate images on buildings, under bridges, and in tunnels.

Influence 
According to many sources, Paul Curtis is the originator of the reverse graffiti technique, which involves creating negative lines and space through dirt to create an image or pattern. The idea of "reverse graffiti" came to Paul through cleaning the walls of a smoke friendly diner where he worked as a teenager and observing the impact of cleaning, while also displaying a sense of humor and defiance.

Style 
Moose's art expression is considered non-damaging to the Earth's environment as well as temporary. Eventually, the dirt and grime that is cleaned away from the surface will naturally return to its prior state over a period of time.

References

External links
NPR Interview
Symbollix

Living people
British graffiti artists
Pseudonymous artists
Year of birth missing (living people)